Milan Ćopić (4 December 1897 – 1941) was a Yugoslav Croatian communist who was in the International Brigades prison at Camp Lucász during the Spanish Civil War.

He was the brother of Lt. Col. Vladimir Ćopić, commander of the XV International Brigade.

Having arrived in Spain on 11 November 1936, he was the director of the disciplinary prison of the International Brigades in Castelldefels (Barcelona). He was accused of extrajudicial executions and torture. He was tried by Republic in 1938 and sentenced to death, but the sentence was perhaps not executed due to the interference by his brother. 

Ćopić died in 1941 in an unknown location, presumably a Nazi concentration camp, having been arrested in France that year.

References and sources

See also
 Vladimir Ćopić
 Castelldefels Castle

1897 births
1941 deaths
People from Senj
Serbs of Croatia
Croatian communists
Croatian people of the Spanish Civil War
Yugoslav communists
International Brigades personnel
Yugoslav people who died in Nazi concentration camps